Sun FM is a radio station serving Sunderland and large parts of County Durham in England and owned by Nation Broadcasting. It is also available in Tyne and Wear. Sun FM broadcasts on FM, as well as online. The station plays a mix of contemporary and classic popular music alongside local news and travel.

As of September 2022, the station broadcasts to a weekly audience of 28,000, according to RAJAR.

History

Wear FM 

The station was launched by the Sunderland Community Radio Station in 1990 and broadcast as Wear FM, based at the University of Sunderland. Wear FM gained international acclaim for its community programming and social inclusion and won the Sony Award for UK Radio Station of the Year in 1992.

Wear FM ceased transmissions in 1995 when it was taken over by the Minster Sound Group, who relaunched the station as Sun City FM. The station's studios in the Foster Building were taken over by the University of Sunderland.

Sun City FM 

Sun City took over when Wear FM ceased broadcasting in 1995. Sun City 103.4's operator was financially penalised in that year by the Radio Authority for not fully adhering to elements of their Promise of Performance.

Sun FM 

A sale to Border Radio Holdings followed with the new owners rebranding the station as Sun FM. In January 1999 Brian Lister joined as managing director. Sun FM became part of the Capital Radio Group when they acquired Border Radio in April 2000 as part of a three-way deal with Granada TV.

In March 2001, Radio Investments Limited purchased Sun FM and its parent company Bucks Broadcasting. This sale also included the other group station, Mix 96 in Aylesbury. Radio Investments later became known as The Local Radio Company and, in June 2009, was itself acquired by UKRD Group.

In 2018, UKRD Group sold Sun FM to Wales-based radio operator Nation Broadcasting. In March 2020, Nation Broadcasting bought neighbouring Durham Radio and Alpha Radio, merging the stations into Sun FM to enlarge the broadcast area to include large parts of County Durham.

Current programming 
Today, Sun FM broadcasts music, local news, sport and information on 102.8 FM, 103.2 FM, 103.4 FM & 106.8 FM from its Sunderland based studios, reaching southwards through its designated broadcast area to Washington, Ryhope, Houghton-Le-Spring and Murton, and outwards to Newcastle, South Shields, Chester-Le-Street, large parts of County Durham and Darlington.

Transmission 
Sun FM's transmission facility is located on farmland at Haining, to the south-west of Sunderland. It transmits with an ERP of 300 watts.

References

External links

The Local Radio Company
Nation Broadcasting
Sun
Sunderland
Radio stations established in 1990